Yvonnick Raffin (born 3 February 1963) is a French Polynesian politician and Cabinet Minister. He is a member of Tapura Huiraatira.

Raffin was born in Papeete and trained as an engineer. He worked as a deputy director-general at EDT. On 1 May 2017 he was appointed head of social welfare agency  Caisse de Prévoyance Sociale.

On 17 September 2020 he was appointed Minister of Finance in the cabinet of Édouard Fritch, replacing Teva Rohfritsch who had resigned after becoming a Senator. On 10 November 2021 he was also allocated the tourism portfolio following the resignation of Nicole Bouteau. A cabinet reshuffle in February 2022 saw him gain responsibility for telecommunications, but surrender responsibility for tourism.

References

Living people
1963 births
People from Papeete
Tapura Huiraatira politicians
Government ministers of French Polynesia
Economy ministers of French Polynesia
Finance Ministers of French Polynesia